Impressions is a mail order compilation album by English multi-instrumentalist Mike Oldfield released in 1980 on the Tellydisc label.

The first track, a live recording of Tubular Bells part one is from Oldfield's 1979 live album, Exposed. "I Got Rhythm" differs from the one that appears on Platinum and is unique to this release. According to Phillip Newell this version was recorded live in a Southampton concert, on 26 May 1980, during Oldfield's In Concert 1980 tour. "Vivaldi Concerto In C" was previously unreleased had been considered for inclusion on this album but remained shelved until the November 1993 release of the Elements 4-CD Box set.

Track listing 
 "Tubular Bells (Part one)" (Live) - 28:42
 "Ommadawn (Part one)" - 19:14
 "Platinum Part one: Airborne" - 5:06
 "Platinum Part two: Platinum" - 6:03
 "Platinum Part three: Charleston" - 3:17
 "Punkadiddle" - 4:56
 "I Got Rhythm" - 4:43
 "Guilty" - 4:00
 "Pipe Tune" - 2:31
 "In Dulci Jubilo" - 2:50
 "Wreckorder Wrondo" - 2:31
 "Cuckoo Song" - 3:15
 "On Horseback" - 3:25
 "Portsmouth" - 2:00
 "Sailor's Hornpipe" - 1:32

References 

Mike Oldfield compilation albums
1980 compilation albums